Opheliamachine is a postmodernist drama by the Polish-born American playwright and dramaturg, Magda Romanska. Written in the span of ten years, from 2002 to 2012, the play is a response to and polemic with the German playwright Heiner Mueller's Hamletmachine (in German, Die Hamletmaschine). Like Hamletmachine, Opheliamachine is loosely based on Hamlet, by William Shakespeare. The play originated in relation to Romanska's doctoral dissertation on representation of death and femininity.

Some critics believe that in Hamletmachine, Mueller deconstructs the impossible position of an Eastern European intellectual at the peak of the Cold War as well as the seemingly disappearing agency of the author. Likewise, Opheliamachine captures the current historical moment with all its entrapments: the dissolution of national and gender identities, the loss of agency and the solipsism of contemporary lives in an increasingly fragmented—if connected—world, the brutal, animal-like quality of modern relationships, the collapse of a social order and its distinction, the chaos and violence that follows.

Overview 

Written in the tradition of such experimental texts as Pablo Picasso's The Four Little Girls (1946–47), Antoni Artaud's Jet of Blood (1925), or Alfred Jarry's Ubu Roi (1896), Opheliamachine is a collage, pastiche, conglomeration of images that rule over our modern, global, virtual sexuality. The play doesn’t have a plot as such. It is a postmodern tale of love and sex in a fragmented world of questionable values. Hamlet and Ophelia are represented by multiple characters, each in conflict with him- or herself and the other.

Opheliamachine captures the dissolution of the national (local, sexual, etc.) identities leading to the kind of physical and psychological displacement that used to be the traditional immigrant, diasporic condition and which now has become the new normalized global mode of being, a new human condition. The play was inspired by Witold Gombrowicz’ concept of "filistria: the realm of displaced persons of uncertain gender and sexuality living in a postcolonial - and now postideological – world."

In a modern global world of unstable national and sexual identities, Hamlet and Ophelia are both what Fouad Ajami calls "children of the fault lines," "rootless residents" for whom "home is neither in the lands of their birth nor in the diaspora communities where people flee the fire and the failure of tormented places."  Hamlet from Opheliamachine is the postmodern "nowhere man," who finds the comfort of belonging in the virtual reality of TV and the Internet, and "who [has] risen to war against the very messy world that forged [him]."    Ophelia is split between contradictory drives and desires, turning to self-violence in a grotesque gesture of gender mockery.

Premiere 

Opheliamachine premiered in June 2013, at City Garage Theatre Company in Santa Monica, CA. Founded in 1987, City Garage has since presented more than two dozen "Critic’s Choice" or "Pick of the Week" productions.  Its production history includes groundbreaking experimental texts by Neil LaBute, Sarah Kane, Heiner Mueller and Charles Mee.

The Company 

The cast consisted of Joss Glennie Smith (Hamlet), Leah Harf (Therapist/Talk Show Host), Kat Johnston (Ophelia-Writer), RJ Jones (Horatio), Megan Kim (Ophelia-Fighter), Cynthia Mance (Gertrude), Saffron Mazzia (Ophelia-Traveler).
It was directed by Frederique Michel, and produced and designed by Charles A. Duncombe.

Critical reception 

The City Garage production of Opheliamachine was critically acclaimed, receiving a slew of positive reviews from many LA-based media.  Radio station KCRW (local NPR affiliate) picked Opheliamachine as "Thing to See" among "Five Things To Do" in LA over a 4 July weekend. In the podcast about the show, Anthony Byrnes said:

The play itself, written by Magda Romanska, is a series of scenes that explore the themes of femininity, power, sex, rage, love, and madness through a faceted portrayal of Ophelia. Our title character is split in three: we have Ophelia the Brain—typing away at a vintage typewriter complete with bell; Ophelia the terrorist clad in black fatigues with a .45 tucked into her bare midriff; and finally Ophelia the Mad confined to a wedding dress and, at times, a wheelchair. […] If you’re looking for a play or a company that ties everything into neat little knots—this probably isn’t for you. If you’re willing to tackle a play as much as experience it—you won’t be disappointed you spent 60 minutes in their world.

In the preview of the show, Jessica Rizzo in The Cultural Weekly wrote:

Romanska gives us an unsettling and internally conflicted picture of global gender relations. [...] She owes more to the tradition of astringently feminist, linguistically challenging playwriting which includes Sarah Kane and Elfriede Jelinek than she owes to Muller. A worthy heir to this legacy, Romanska carves out a space of critical resistance in Opheliamachine, a space where the ugliest and the most beautiful of our desires can exist, as they do in life, side by side, where the death-dealing and life-giving vie for dominance. 

Myron Meisel, from The Hollywood Reporter, wrote:

Difficult comedy of ideas and ideologies honestly stimulates with its perceptiveness . . . . 
In this world premiere play at City Garage in Santa Monica, Magda Romanska consciously concocts both an homage to and critique of a landmark theatrical composition, 1979’s Hamletmachine by Heiner Müller, the successor to Brecht as both director of the Berliner Ensemble and groundbreaking German experimental playwright. […] Since City Garage has been conscientious over its two decades in presenting Müller’s work locally, it’s appropriate that it should mount Romanska’s fiercely meditative mirror, which quotes excerpts from Hamletmachine at the beginning and the end in both deference and defiance. […]

If the modern take on Hamlet is that his consciousness inhibits his ability to act, then the ironies of Opheliamachine posit that radical analysis can be the enemy of effective political action, or put another way, that gender awareness is no refuge from the truism that each of us must reckon ourselves as our own most implacable adversary. Romanska is a well-versed academic and accomplished dramaturg, and she heeds the cherished advice to write about what she knows. Thankfully, she has a vision comprehensive enough to relish irony and pose deeper questions than mere indictment. If the world might be viewed more rewardingly without the arbitrary distinctions between the sexes, those prejudices must be confronted if any substantive change is to be accomplished in the world as it is. Romanska dramatizes the wisdom that confrontation comprises only the first essential steps. [. . .] This funny yet brutal play needs the inventive mise-en-scene to support its fecundity of ideas amidst the tumult of its conflicting impulses. And don’t be afraid: It is OK, even purgative, to laugh.

Philip Brandes of Los Angeles Times, praised the production:

An uncompromising vision. […] fiercely confrontational new play. […] In her own fashionably postmodern fashion, the title character in the visually stylish Opheliamachine at Santa Monica’s City Garage is a tragic figure, though she bears only slight textual ties to Shakespeare’s original archetype. [. . .] stream-of-consciousness monologues as densely associative and enigmatic as Müller’s [. . .] Though Ophelia’s quest for self-determination teeters on the brink of inevitable annihilation, she "fails better" (in Samuel Beckett‘s sense). With few traditional theater points of reference to navigate by, her uncompromising journey is not for the intellectually incurious.

Steven Leigh Morris, wrote for LA Weekly:

A vigorous deconstruction of the feminine psyche, image and gender roles, […] Romanska’s script—heavy laden with dense imagery and symbolism—explores love, sex, violence, politics, class sensibilities, feminist aesthetics, the vacuities of mass culture and the timeless mystery of death. This is theater that’s not easily accessible and is devilishly bleak at times, but it’s not without shards of humor, and is relentlessly provocative and challenging.

Rose Desena wrote for The Los Angeles Post:

Stunning piece of performance art. […]  Frederique’s vision and creativity along with the brilliant writing of Magda Romanska takes us on a visionary exploration of love, politics and confused emotions. […]  Both Ophelia and Hamlet are separated by Ocean, unable to connect with their physical emotions. Frederique uses TV screens with constant news footage to convey the message of the world in gloom while the large over screen shows us beauty, sex and the complexity of the world we live in. Hamlet (Joss Glennie-Smith) is glued to the TV using that acts as his medium for understanding the world around him. […]The metaphors are nonstop, making this an intense and complex work of art.  […] What I can say is please don’t miss this. Whether you fully comprehend it or just enjoy, is a fabulous treat for your psyche. 
Sarah A. Spitz wrote for Santa Monica Daily Press:

In the case of City Garage, once again this outstanding local company engages in thought provocation. […] The City Garage takes Ophelia out of her poor, put-upon, mad girl role and places her in the context of a media-saturated, social network-driven 21st century world, in which she faces down the forces that shape her image as a woman. […] In Polish playwright Magda Romanska’s Opheliamachine, we find multiple characters and voices representing Ophelia as she confronts a world of contradictory images for women, while considering her choices about a brooding Hamlet who "wants to understand the world but all he can do is stare at it." 
Ben Miles from Showmag wrote:

Each Ophelia on display is a postmodern feminist prototype, meant to provoke us to consider the oppressed psychology of Hamlet’s co-character. Is Ophelia a threat or a menace? Is Ophelia somehow disabled, or at least disempowered? Is Ophelia a heroine or a victim, or perhaps both? While there are no answers put forth regarding these suppositions, what we do get is a nonlinear overview of Ophelia’s largely unfulfilled potential as an individual and dramatic character. What Opheliamachine lacks in plot, it makes up for it in a visual narrative that is borderline assaultive. […] Opheliamachine is not for everyone. There’s full frontal female nudity on display, and the theatrical conceit is esoteric to say the least. But for Shakespeare aficionados and for curious theatergoers, Opheliamachine is a challenging and unsettling experience.

Performance History 

On October 27, 2014,Opheliamachine received a staged reading at the experimental performance space, The Brick Theatre in Brooklyn, NY.  The reading was directed by Jackson Gay (Yale School of Drama), with Patch Darragh as Hamlet, Danielle Slavick as Ophelia/Writer, Ceci Fernandez as Ophelia/Fighter, Sarah Sokolovic as Ophelia/Traveler and Jeanine Serralles as Gertrude.

Translations 

In 2014, Opheliamachine was translated and published in Italian journal, Mimesis, with an introduction by Italian theatre scholar, Maria Pia Pagani.

References 

Postmodern plays
2013 plays
Plays and musicals based on Hamlet